Fatemeh Saeidi is an Iranian educator and reformist politician who is currently a member of the Parliament of Iran representing Tehran, Rey, Shemiranat and Eslamshahr electoral district.

Career 
Saeidi is employee of Ministry of Education and works as the principal of a school in Tehran.

Electoral history

References

1962 births
Living people
People from Tehran
Iranian educators
Executives of Construction Party politicians
Members of the 10th Islamic Consultative Assembly
Members of the Women's fraction of Islamic Consultative Assembly